Georgios Dimizas (born 24 July 1994) is a Greek professional footballer who plays as a goalkeeper.

Honours
MEAP Nisou
Cypriot Fourth Division: 2012–13

Kavala
Gamma Ethniki: 2018–19

References

1994 births
Living people
Greek footballers
Greek expatriate footballers
Super League Greece players
Football League (Greece) players
Gamma Ethniki players
Cypriot Fourth Division players
MEAP Nisou players
Niki Volos F.C. players
Panachaiki F.C. players
Kavala F.C. players
Association football goalkeepers
People from Sitia
Footballers from Crete
Olympiacos F.C. players